"Azul" (English: Blue) is a song and title track written by Kike Santander and Gustavo Santander and performed by Mexican singer-songwriter Cristian Castro. It was released as the lead single from his seventh studio album Azul (2001). At the 2002 Billboard Latin Music Awards, the song received a nomination for Latin Pop Airplay of the Year which was awarded to Juan Gabriel for "Abrázame Muy Fuerte". The song also received a Lo Nuestro Award nomination for Pop Song of the Year which was also awarded to "Abrázame Muy Fuerte" by Gabriel.

Track listing
Single
Personal Greeting
"Azul" (Album Version) - 4:24
Screensaver

Remixes
"Azul" (Album Version) - 4:24
"Azul" (Dance Remix) - 4:32
"Azul" (Merengue Version) - 4:14
"Azul" (Merengue Version with Guitar Intro) - 4:20

Chart performance

Year-end charts

Music videos
A music video, directed by Pedro Torres, was shot in 2001 in South Beach, Florida. The music video was premiered on Primer Impacto on June 6 and aired on MTV on June 7; and starred two models and some Castro's friends. The music video was included on Nunca Voy a Olvidarte...Los Exitos DVD.

See also
List of number-one Billboard Hot Latin Tracks of 2001
List of number-one Billboard Hot Latin Pop Airplay of 2001

References

2001 singles
2001 songs
Cristian Castro songs
Spanish-language songs
Songs written by Kike Santander
RCA Records singles
Song recordings produced by Kike Santander
2000s ballads
Pop ballads
Rock ballads
Songs written by Gustavo Santander